The Pomeranian Voivodeship was a unit of administrative division and local government in the Kingdom of Poland and the Polish–Lithuanian Commonwealth from 1454/1466 until the First partition of Poland in 1772.
From 1613 the capital was at Skarszewy.

The name Pomerania derives from the Slavic po more, meaning "by the sea" or "on the sea".

History
The voivodeship comprised the westernmost part of Royal Prussia.

After the 1454 uprising of the Prussian Confederation and the Thirteen Years' War, the area fell back to the Polish Crown according to the Second Peace of Thorn in 1466. Together with the Chełmno (former Kulmerland) and Malbork (Marienburg) voivodeships and the Prince-Bishopric of Warmia (Ermland) it formed the autonomous province of Royal Prussia. The autonomy of the region was later abolished as a result of the Union of Lublin in 1569 and the area was incorporated into the Polish Crown.

In older English sources and generally in German language use, for this region the appellation of Pomerelia (German: Pommerellen or Pomerellen, rendered as Pomorze Gdańskie in Polish) prevails, because the name Pomerania (German: Pommern) usually refers to the western Duchy of Pomerania (Polish: Księstwo Pomorskie), ruled by the House of Griffins, who had become vassals of the Holy Roman Emperor in 1181. In turn for their support in the Thirteen Years' War, the Griffin dukes in 1455 gained the Pomerelian Lauenburg and Bütow Land as a Polish fief, which upon the extinction of the dynasty in 1637 fell back to the Polish Crown and by the 1657 Treaty of Bromberg was given to the Brandenburg margraves, who also ruled over the adjacent Imperial Pomerania Province.

For the Polish Crown the fact turned out to be fatal, that after the 1525 establishment of Ducal Prussia on the remaining territory of the Teutonic Order, the Pomeranian Voivodeship separated two territories, which were both held by the rising House of Hohenzollern, since 1618 in the personal union of Brandenburg-Prussia. After the Polish crown had given up suzerainty over Ducal Prussia by the 1657 Treaty of Wehlau and the Brandenburg margraves had assumed the title of a King in Prussia in 1701, the Hohenzollerns sought to link their territories. On the eve of the Polish partitions, King Frederick II of Prussia in 1771 finally incorporated Lauenburg and Bütow into the Pomerania Province. In the course of the First Partition the next year, he furthermore annexed the Pomeranian voivodeship with Royal Prussia, then renamed as the Province of West Prussia – except for the City of Gdańsk (Danzig), which was not incorporated until the Second Partition of 1793.

Today the historic administrative region roughly corresponds to the present-day Pomeranian Voivodeship of Poland, which also comprises the Lands of Słupsk (Stolp), that formerly belonged to the Duchy of Pomerania, as well as the territory of the former Malbork Voivodeship, that until 1230 had been part of the Prussian tribal territory.

Administration
Voivodeship Governor (Wojewoda) seat:
 Skarszewy

Regional council (sejmik generalny)
 Starogard Gdański

Regional councils (sejmik poselski i deputacki)
 Człuchów
 Tuchola
 Świecie
 Starogród
 Puck

Administrative divisions:
 Człuchów County, (Powiat Człuchowski), Człuchów
 Gdańsk County, (Powiat Gdański), Gdańsk
 Koscierzyna County, (Powiat Kościerzyński), Kościerzyna
 Mirachowo County, (Powiat Mirachowski), Mirachowo
 Nowe County, (Powiat Nowski), Nowe
 Puck County, (Powiat Pucki), Puck
 Skarszewy County, (Powiat Skarszewski), Skarszewy
 Stargard County, (Powiat Starogrodzki) Starogard Gdański
 Świecie County, (Powiat Świecki), Świecie
 Tczew County, (Powiat Tczewski), Tczew
 Tuchola County, (Powiat Tucholski), Tuchola

From 1637 to 1657, the Lębork-Bytów Land.

See also
 Pomeranian Voivodeship (1919–1939)

References

Voivodeships of the Polish–Lithuanian Commonwealth
Royal Prussia
1466 establishments in Europe
15th-century establishments in Poland
1772 disestablishments in the Polish–Lithuanian Commonwealth